Drymusidae is a family of araneomorph spiders first described by Eugène Simon in 1893, and elevated to family status by Pekka T. Lehtinen in 1986.

Genera

, the World Spider Catalog accepts the following genera:

Drymusa Simon, 1892 — Caribbean, Costa Rica, South America
Izithunzi Labarque, Pérez-González & Griswold, 2018 — South Africa

References

 
Araneomorphae families